Henryk Jan Szordykowski (3 June 1944 – 25 December 2022) was a Polish runner who specialized in the 800 metres and 1500 metres.

He was born in Iłowo-Osada and represented the club Wawel Kraków. In his early career he finished eighth in the 1500 metres at the 1966 European Championships, At the 1968 Olympic Games he competed in the 800 metres event, failing to progress from the first round, and finished seventh in the final of the 1500 metres event. At the 1969 European Indoor Games, he won the silver medal in the 800 metres and a gold medal in the medley relay.

Then, in the 1500 metres he won a bronze medal at the 1969 European Championships and a silver at the 1971 European Championships. He won the gold at the 1970, 1971, 1973 and 1974 European Indoor Championships. At the 1972 Olympic Games he reached the semi-final of the 1500 metres event. He finished sixth in the 1500 metres at the 1975 European Indoor Championships.

He became Polish champion in the 800 metres in 1966, 1967 and 1969, and in the 1500 metres in 1968, 1971, 1972 and 1974. He became Polish indoor champion in the 1500 metres in 1974, and also American indoor champion in 1969 and 1971.

His personal best time in the 800 metres was 1:46.6 minutes, achieved in 1968. In the 1500 metres he had 3.38.2 minutes, achieved in August 1969 in Warsaw. He had 3.58.8 minutes in the mile run, achieved in July 1972 in Stockholm.

Szordykowski died on 25 December 2022, at the age of 78.

He was the brother of Zenon Szordykowski.

International competitions

1Did not start in the semifinals.

References

1944 births
2022 deaths
Polish male middle-distance runners
Athletes (track and field) at the 1968 Summer Olympics
Athletes (track and field) at the 1972 Summer Olympics
Olympic athletes of Poland
People from Działdowo County
European Athletics Championships medalists
Sportspeople from Warmian-Masurian Voivodeship
20th-century Polish people